Stronghurst is a village in Henderson County, Illinois, United States. The population was 883 at the 2010 census. It is part of the Burlington, IA–IL Micropolitan Statistical Area.

Geography
Stronghurst is located in southern Henderson County at  (40.744616, -90.908801). Illinois Route 94 passes through the village, leading north  to Biggsville and south  to La Harpe. Burlington, Iowa, is 15 miles to the northwest.

Demographics

As of the census of 2000, there were 896 people, 353 households, and 236 families residing in the village. The racial makeup of the village was 99.22% White, 0.11% African American, and 0.67% from two or more races. Hispanic or Latino of any race were 0.11% of the population.

There were 353 households, out of which 31.2% had children under the age of 18 living with them, 55.0% were married couples living together, 8.2% had a female householder with no husband present, and 32.9% were non-families. 29.5% of all households were made up of individuals, and 19.0% had someone living alone who was 65 years of age or older.  The average household size was 2.38 and the average family size was 2.97.

In the village, the population was spread out, with 24.7% under the age of 18, 6.5% from 18 to 24, 24.7% from 25 to 44, 20.1% from 45 to 64, and 24.1% who were 65 years of age or older.  The median age was 41 years. For every 100 females, there were 87.4 males.  For every 100 females age 18 and over, there were 80.5 males.

The median income for a household in the village was $32,054, and the median income for a family was $46,375. Males had a median income of $30,885 versus $20,096 for females. The per capita income for the village was $17,269.  About 2.6% of families and 6.9% of the population were below the poverty line, including 7.4% of those under age 18 and 7.2% of those age 65 or over.

Community activities
Community activities include the Henderson County Fair, the Henderson County Old Tyme Farm Show, and the holiday merchants' walk. An annual Easter egg hunt has been held at the city park for the last few years.

References

Villages in Henderson County, Illinois
Villages in Illinois
Burlington, Iowa micropolitan area